Chu Văn Tấn (22 May 1909 – 1984 in Võ Nhai) was a Vietnamese general. He was a member of the 1st Central Committee of the Communist Party of Vietnam and Minister of Defense in the 1945 provisional cabinet of the DRV.

References

1909 births
1984 deaths
Vietnamese generals
Ministers of Defence of Vietnam
Nùng people
Members of the 1st Central Committee of the Indochinese Communist Party
Members of the 2nd Central Committee of the Workers' Party of Vietnam
Members of the 3rd Central Committee of the Workers' Party of Vietnam